The ECHL Goaltender of the Year is an ice hockey award presented annually by the ECHL to the goaltender adjudged to be the best at his position. This award was first presented in 1994 to Cory Cadden of the Knoxville Cherokees.

List of winners

See also
ECHL awards

References

Goal
Ice hockey goaltender awards